Crusader is the 1999 fantasy novel by Australian author, Sara Douglass, it was first published in Australia as the conclusion of The Wayfarer Redemption trilogy, and then published in the United States and Europe as the finale of the Wayfarer Redemption sextet. It is preceded by Pilgrim.

Plot summary

Raging at the escape of the StarSon, Qeteb has the Hawkchilds scour the remains of Tencendor.  Although they don't immediately find Sanctuary, a Hawkchild does find and return the wooden bowl given to Faraday by the Mother, though they do not know how to use it.  Unaware of this oversight, the Mother, Ur, and the Horned Ones wait in the Sacred Groves, slowly dying. Meanwhile, at sanctuary many are discontented and impatient, finding it more of a prison then a sanctuary. Axis walks to the bridge and begins talking to it, though halfway through it begins screaming and it dies, and Axis nearly falls into the chasm below until Drago saves him, and though Axis notices a some sort of power in him, he still stubbornly refuses to forgive him for Caelum's death, thinking he is still the malevolent man he was when he was a baby, who always wanted Caelum's inheritance. Drago then talks to Azhure, who also recognises he has some sort of power, and on departure recognises him as Dragonstar, not Drago.

References

1999 Australian novels
1999 fantasy novels
Australian fantasy novels
HarperCollins books
Novels by Sara Douglass